Sofiane Gagnon (born April 12, 1999) is a Canadian freestyle skier who competes internationally.

She competed in the FIS Freestyle Ski and Snowboarding World Championships 2019, where she placed tenth in women's moguls and sixteenth in women's dual moguls, and in FIS Freestyle Ski and Snowboarding World Championships 2021, where she placed nineteenth in women's moguls, and fourth in women's dual moguls.

On January 24, 2022, Gagnon was named to Canada's 2022 Olympic team.

References

1999 births
Living people
Canadian female freestyle skiers
Freestyle skiers at the 2022 Winter Olympics
Olympic freestyle skiers of Canada